London Museum of Water & Steam  is an independent museum founded in 1975 as the Kew Bridge Steam Museum. It was rebranded in early 2014 following a major investment project.

Situated on the site of the old Kew Bridge Pumping Station in Brentford, near Kew Bridge on the River Thames in West London, England, the museum is centred on a collection of stationary water pumping steam engines dating from 1820 to 1910. It is the home of the world's largest collection of working Cornish engines, including the Grand Junction 90 inch,  the largest such working engine in the world. The site is an anchor point on the European Route of Industrial Heritage (ERIH).

The museum reopened on 22 March 2014.

History

Kew Bridge Pumping Station was originally opened in 1838 by the Grand Junction Waterworks Company, following a decision to close an earlier pumping station at Chelsea due to poor water quality. In the years up to 1944 the site expanded, ultimately housing six steam pumping engines as well as four Allen diesel pumps and four electric pump sets. The steam engines were retired from service in 1944, although two were kept on standby until 1958, when a demonstration run of the Harvey & Co. 100 inch engine marked the final time steam power would pump drinking water at the site.

The Metropolitan Water Board decided not to scrap the resident steam pumping engines and set them aside to form the basis of a museum display at a later date. This action bore fruit in 1974 with the formation of the Kew Bridge Engines Trust, a registered charity, by a group of volunteers previously involved in the restoration of the Crofton Pumping Station.

Today the site is an internationally recognised museum of working steam pumping engines,  a reminder of the many pumping stations spread throughout London and the UK. In 1999, the United Kingdom government Department for Culture, Media and Sport described Kew Bridge as "the most important historic site of the water supply industry in Britain".

The Kew Bridge Engine Trust and Water Supply Museum Limited, a registered charity, has three aims:
 to restore (and maintain) the five historic beam engines at the Kew Bridge site
 to add other important water pumping engines
 to establish a museum of London's water supply.

In 1997 the museum was awarded an Engineering Heritage Award by the American Society of Mechanical Engineers (ASME) and Britain's Institute of Mechanical Engineers (IMechE). A second IMechE Engineering Hallmark was awarded in 2008 for the restoration of the Bull engine, making the museum one of only 12 sites to achieve more than one of these awards.

Engines

The museum houses the world's largest collection of Cornish cycle beam engines, including the largest working beam engine, the Grand Junction 90 inch, which has a cylinder diameter of 90 inches and was used to pump water to London for 98 years. This machine is over 40 feet high and weighs about 250 tons. It was described by Charles Dickens as "a monster".

The museum also has several other working Cornish cycle beam engines, and other working steam engines, as well as a three-cylinder Allen diesel engine which is also on public display and frequently run.

A complete list of the pumping engines at the museum is as follows:
 Sandys, Carne and Vivyan (Copperhouse Foundry)  90 inch
 Harvey & Co. 100 inch
 Bull engine
 Maudslay engine
 Boulton & Watt (or West Cornish engine)
 James Simpson & Co. (or Waddon engine)
 Easton and Amos engine
 Hathorn Davey & Co. triple expansion engine
 James Kay, (or Dancer's End engine)
 Allen diesel engine
 Hindley waterwheel

The museum also operates an 1860 Shand Mason Fire Engine on selected event days.

Railway

The museum runs a  narrow-gauge railway which in 2009 saw the introduction of a new-build Wren Class steam locomotive, named for the engineer Thomas Wicksteed. The railway had previously been operated by visiting loan locomotives. The line runs for 400 yards around the Kew Bridge site, and passenger trains are operated at weekends and on other special event days.

Although not an original feature of the waterworks at Kew Bridge, the railway was inspired by similar facilities provided at major waterworks in the UK, notably the Metropolitan Water Board Railway that originally ran between Hampton and the Kempton Park waterworks. A small part of that railway is now operated as the Kempton Steam Railway, comprising the only other site in London where rides can be taken on steam trains of such a large size; it has benefitted from some very generous assistance, in its restoration, from the London Museum of Water & Steam.

Locomotives

The site
The museum site contains a number of Grade I and Grade II listed buildings. 
The original engine house, home of the Bull, Boulton & Watt and Maudslay engines, was built in 1837 and is Grade I listed, as is the Great Engine House, housing the 90 inch and 100 inch engines,  which was constructed in two parts in 1845 and 1869.

The Boiler House, which now houses the rotative steam engines, was built in 1837, and along with the ancillary buildings and Gatehouse and Boundary Wall, is Grade II listed.

The ancillary buildings, which include a fully working forge and belt driven workshop, are used by a number of independent artists and creatives.

The tower
The museum's most striking feature is its 200 ft high Victorian standpipe tower. This is not a chimney stack; it houses two systems of vertical pipes through which water was pumped before it entered the mains water supply. The brick tower, of Italianate design, was constructed in 1867 to replace an earlier open metal lattice structure. It is a Grade I listed building. The tower is rarely open to the Public.

Use in television
The museum has been a filming location for episodes of TV serials including EastEnders, The Bill, Doctor Who ("Remembrance of the Daleks") and Industrial Age. As well as many music videos and feature films, including Jude Law's The Wisdom of Crocodiles, it was also used as the location for the 1991-1995 title sequence of the BBC music show Top of the Pops. After relaunching in 2014, the museum became a filming location for the fourth episode of the TV series PREMature.

See also
 Crossness Pumping Stationa steam-powered pumping station in Southeast London 
 Kempton Park Steam Engines
 Kempton Steam Railway
 Metropolitan Water Board Railway
 Pumping station
 The Musical Museum is nearby

References

External links

 Official website
 Project Aquarius
 Kew Bridge Engines Trust
 Extensive photo gallery of the museum exhibits
 Review and visitor information for The Kew Bridge Steam Museum

2 ft gauge railways in England
Brentford, London
Buildings and structures on the River Thames
Cornish engines
European Route of Industrial Heritage Anchor Points
Heritage railways in London
Infrastructure completed in 1838
London water infrastructure
Museums established in 1975
Museums in the London Borough of Hounslow
Museums on the River Thames
Preserved beam engines
Preserved stationary steam engines
Railway museums in England
Steam museums in London
Towers completed in 1838
Water supply infrastructure
Waterworks museums in England
Former pumping stations